Hidrobo Vilson Rosero Rodríguez (born 24 August 1974) is a retired Ecuadorian football midfielder.

International career
He was a member of the Ecuador national football team at the 1997 Copa América, and obtained a total number of four caps during his career and was a member of the Ecuador squad for Copa América 1997.

References

External links

1974 births
Living people
People from Chimborazo Province
Association football midfielders
Ecuadorian footballers
Ecuador international footballers
1997 Copa América players
C.D. El Nacional footballers
C.D. Universidad Católica del Ecuador footballers
C.S.D. Macará footballers
S.D. Aucas footballers